Irkutsk State University was founded in October 1918 in Irkutsk, Siberia. Nowadays Irkutsk State University is a large scientific and educational institution training students in humanities, natural, technical and applied sciences. ISU facilities include 8 educational institutions, 11 faculties, the scientific library that is one of the largest University libraries in Russia. ISU offers bachelor, master, post-graduate programs for more than 18,000 students that have opportunity to specialize under the supervision of world-known scientists.

Among other facilities Irkutsk State University has the Center for Advanced Training and Retraining, 3 research institutes, Interregional Institute of Social Sciences, Center for New Information Technologies, Baikal Research and Education Center, department for post-graduate and doctoral courses, scientific libraries, astronomical observatory and botanic garden.

The University faculties and institutions are located in 14 educational buildings in Irkutsk. The majority of these buildings are of great historical and architectural value. They date back to the 18th-19th centuries. Senior students of all the faculties have specialized courses and internship in laboratories and scientific research institutions of ISU and Siberian Branch of the Russian Academy of Sciences.

For decades, Irkutsk University has trained more than 80 thousand highly qualified specialists, famous scientists, teachers, writers, and statesmen, including State Prize winners and famous talented writers V. Rasputin, A. Vampilov, and M. Sergeev.

History
Russian scientists, statesmen, patrons of art and science, such as N.M. Yadrintsev, A.P. Shchapov, P.A. Slovtsov, S.S. Shchukin, G.N. Potanin and many others were founders of Irkutsk State University. The University was opened on October 27, 1918. It became the major educational, scientific and cultural center on the vast territory of Eastern Siberia and Far East region. During the 1930s, the University continued to grow and develop and soon in Irkutsk the first higher educational institutions emerged from it. They were Medical Institute, Pedagogical Institute and the Institute of National Economy. At present, the ISU graduates work in scientific institutions of Siberian Branch of the Russian Academy of Sciences, Academy of Medical Sciences, as well as they represent highly qualified personnel of teachers in higher educational institutions of Irkutsk and Siberia.

Faculties and Institutes
At present, the University consists of 11 faculties and 8 educational institutions. Over 14500 thousand students, including 880 foreign students from 23 countries, and more than 1155 lecturers (142 Dr. Sc.  and 625 Cand. Sc. professors) work there. Among other facilities Irkutsk State University has the Center for Advanced Training and Retraining, 3 research institutes, Interregional Institute of Social Sciences, Center for New Information Technologies, Baikal Research and Education Center, department for post-graduate and doctoral courses, scientific libraries, astronomical observatory and botanic garden.

International Institute of Economics and Linguistics 
Institute of Mathematics and Information Technologies  
Institute of Social Sciences 
Continuing Education Institute
Pedagogical Institute
Law Institute
Baikal International Business School
Law Institute
Institute of Philology, Foreign Languages and Media Communication
Faculty of Biology and Soil Studies 
Faculty of Business and Management 
Faculty of Chemistry
Faculty of Geography 
Faculty of Geology 
Faculty of History 
Faculty of Psychology 
Faculty of Physics 
Faculty of Business-Communications and Computer Science 
Preparatory Faculty for Foreign Citizens
Siberian-American Faculty of Management

Notable faculty members
Semyon Novgorodov, creator of a Yakut alphabet

Notable alumni
 Valentin Rasputin, writer
 Alexander Vampilov, writer
 Mark Sergeev, poet
 Evgeny Chernikin, zoologist and ecologist

References

External links

Irkutsk State University Official
Institutes and faculties
Scientific-Research Institutes
Branches in Angarsk and Bratsk
Botanic Garden of Irkutsk State University  or Botanic Garden of the Irkutsk State University

 
Educational institutions established in 1918
Buildings and structures in Irkutsk
1918 establishments in Russia
Universities in Irkutsk Oblast